The 1968 Miami Redskins football team was an American football team that represented Miami University in the Mid-American Conference (MAC) during the 1968 NCAA University Division football season. In their sixth and final season under Bo Schembechler, Miami compiled a 7–3 record (5–1 against MAC opponents), finished in second place in the MAC, and outscored all opponents by a combined total of 240 to 99.

The team's statistical leaders included quarterback Kent Thompson with 970 passing yards, halfback Cleveland Dickerson with 736 rushing yards, and end Mike Palija with 334 receiving yards.  The team's defense allowed only 9.9 points per game, the best among 119 NCAA University Division football teams.

Linebacker Bob Babich was selected as a first-team All-American by the American Football Coaches Association, Time magazine, and The Sporting News.  He also won the MAC and Miami most valuable player awards. Eight Miami players were selected as first-team All-MAC players: Babich, tight end Gary Arthur, defensive back Dick Boron, offensive tackle Dave Hutchins, defensive tackle Errol Kahoun, defensive end Merv Nugent, linebacker Bob Rieber, and offensive guard Larry Thompson. Babich was the team captain.

Schedule

References

Miami
Miami RedHawks football seasons
Miami Redskins football